Haverfordwest Castle is the name of an electoral ward in Pembrokeshire, Wales. It covers the centre of the town of Haverfordwest west of the river including the High Street, Winch Lane and north along Crowhill Road. It elects a councillor to Pembrokeshire County Council.

Castle ward also elects three community councillors to Haverfordwest Town Council.

According to the 2011 UK Census the population of the ward was 2,301 (with 1,855 of voting age).

County elections
At the May 2012 and May 2017 election the county council seat was retained by Thomas Tudor for Welsh Labour. 2017 saw his wife Alison Tudor win the neighbouring Haverfordwest Prendergast seat.

Cllr Thomas Tudor has been a Pembrokeshire County Councillor for the seat since 1995.

See also
 Haverfordwest Priory (electoral ward)
 List of electoral wards in Pembrokeshire

References

Pembrokeshire electoral wards
Haverfordwest